Wilbert Ross Thatcher,  (May 24, 1917 – July 22, 1971) was the ninth premier of Saskatchewan, serving from May 22, 1964 to June 30, 1971. He led the Saskatchewan Liberal Party in four general elections, in 1960,  1964, 1967 and 1971.  Thatcher was defeated in his first election in 1960, but won the next two elections in 1964 and 1967 with majority governments.  Following his defeat in the general election of 1971, he retired from politics and died shortly afterwards.

Early life, family, education, and early business career
Born in Neville, Saskatchewan, Thatcher was a Moose Jaw-based businessman, who developed an interest in politics shortly after the birth of his son, Colin Thatcher. Ross's father, Wilbur, had built a chain of hardware stores across the province, which the son helped to manage.

He graduated from high school at 15, and attended Queen's University, in Kingston, Ontario, where he earned a commerce degree at 18.

Immediately following graduation, Thatcher became executive assistant to the vice-president of Canada Packers, in Toronto, but had to return to Saskatchewan to run the family business after his father had become ill. By this time, the family business included outlets in Regina and Saskatoon as well as the original Moose Jaw store, and was prospering. Thatcher employed his siblings to assist him.

Political career

Federal CCF Member of Parliament
Believing that because of the Great Depression, private business alone could not stimulate economic development in the province, he joined the Co-operative Commonwealth Federation and was elected to Moose Jaw City Council on a labour-reform slate in 1942. In 1945, he was elected to Parliament representing Moose Jaw.

Thatcher grew increasingly uncomfortable in the CCF because of his roots in the business world, and he soon found himself on the right wing of the party caucus. He gradually shifted away from the CCF,.  In 1955, he left the CCF over the issue of corporate taxation, saying that he was "opposed to Socialism and all it stands for". He sat as an Independent MP for the rest of his term, before running unsuccessfully for the Liberal Party of Canada in the federal elections of  1957 and 1958.

Mossbank debate
During the 1957 federal campaign, Thatcher attacked the provincial CCF government's record on crown corporations by describing them as a dismal failure. Saskatchewan Premier Tommy Douglas challenged Thatcher to a debate in the town of Mossbank, which was broadcast on the radio across the province.

The debate was widely regarded as a draw. However, many observers believed that Thatcher had more than held his own against the formidable Douglas. The debate established Thatcher as the province's main anti-CCF standard bearer.

Defeat in federal politics
Thatcher was defeated by Hazen Argue of the CCF in the 1957 federal election and again in 1958.

Entry to provincial politics
Despite his defeat at the federal level, Thatcher was courted by the provincial Saskatchewan Liberal Party and became its leader in 1959 at the party's leadership convention by defeating three rivals. He led the party into the 1960 provincial election, which was fought over the issue of Medicare. The Liberals increased their level of public support but could not make a significant dent in the Saskatchewan CCF's large majority. The CCF had held power since the 1944 election.

Thatcher himself was elected to the Legislative Assembly of Saskatchewan from the rural southern riding of Morse.

Enters ranching business
In the late 1950s, Thatcher transitioned away from hardware, and into farming and cattle ranching, in the Moose Jaw area. He employed his son Colin as a full-time manager of his agricultural businesses, starting in 1962. The younger Thatcher had earned two agricultural degrees at Iowa State University. The new business ventures proved successful.

Premier of Saskatchewan
The Liberals had gained momentum, however, and the anti-CCF opposition coalesced around them, particularly in the face of events such as the Saskatchewan doctors' strike, which had hurt the CCF's popularity. The Liberals won a string of by-elections over the next three years. Douglas, premier since 1944, stepped down as premier in November, 1961, as he had been elected leader of the newly-formed federal New Democratic Party, earlier that year; this step significantly weakened the Saskatchewan CCF-NDP.

In the 1964 provincial election, the Liberals won a narrow victory that ended 20 years of CCF-NDP government. The Liberals were only 0.1% ahead of the CCF in the popular vote. However, a sharp decline in Social Credit support allowed the Liberals to win a six-seat majority.

By now, there was very little left of Thatcher's roots in the CCF. His government sold several crown corporations and declared the province "open for business" by encouraging private investment in the potash and other industries.

On economic issues, Thatcher's government was classically liberal, and Thatcher often clashed with the federal Liberal governments of Lester Pearson and Pierre Trudeau over agricultural policy, social welfare policies (which the federal party supported and Thatcher opposed), and constitutional reform as well as the federal Liberals' attempts to form a federal political organization in the province separate from the provincial party.

Thatcher was re-elected with a slightly-increased majority in 1967. He then introduced an austerity program, which cut government services, increased taxes, and introduced user fees on medical procedures. Reduced government investment hurt both the potash industry and agriculture, and Thatcher's administration became increasingly unpopular.

His government was defeated by the Saskatchewan New Democratic Party, the new name of the Saskatchewan CCF, which was led by Allan Blakeney, in the June 1971 election.

Although the Liberals won roughly the same number of votes as in 1967, a collapse in Progressive Conservative support resulted in the Liberals losing almost half of their seats.

Death
In July 1971, only a few weeks after his defeat in the election, he died in his sleep in Regina, Saskatchewan, apparently as a result of complications from diabetes and a heart condition. His death shocked the Saskatchewan public, and JoAnn Thatcher, who at the time was the wife of the former premier's son Colin Thatcher, later claimed she suspected the death was a suicide. However, it was an open secret that Thatcher had largely refused to deal with his severe diabetes over the years.  A former aide told reporters that Thatcher's health had been so run down that his death from natural causes surprised few insiders.

CTV News journalist Keith Morrison interviewed Thatcher only a few hours before his death and is believed to be the last reporter to speak to him.

Family

Peggy Thatcher
Thatcher's widow, Peggy, was persuaded to run for the federal parliament in support of Trudeau's Liberals in the 1972 federal election but came only a weak third in Regina East.

Colin Thatcher
In the 1975 provincial election Thatcher's son, Colin, won a seat in Thunder Creek, a new constituency that contained parts of the riding that his father had represented. Although he was first elected as a Liberal, he later crossed the floor to the Progressive Conservatives before joining the government after the Blakeney government was swept from power in the 1982 provincial election. Following a brief stint as a cabinet minister in the Progressive Conservative government, he was later charged with murdering his ex-wife, JoAnn Wilson. He was convicted of first degree murder by the jury in the Saskatchewan Court of Queen's Bench.  His appeals to the Saskatchewan Court of Appeal and the Supreme Court of Canada were dismissed.

Electoral history

Summary

He led the Saskatchewan Liberal Party in four general elections, in 1960,  1964, 1967 and 1971.  Thatcher was defeated in his first election in 1960, but won the next two elections in 1964 and 1967 with majority governments.  Following his defeat in the general election of 1971, he was succeeded as Premier by Allan Blakeney, leader of the Saskatchewan New Democratic Party (NDP). Thatcher was the sixth and last Liberal premier to date.

Thatcher was elected to the Legislative Assembly of Saskatchewan four times from 1960 to 1971.  He was the Leader of the Opposition from 1960 to 1964.

Prior to entering provincial politics, Thatcher had been involved in federal politics, originally as a member of the CCF, then as an Independent, and finally as a Liberal.

Saskatchewan general elections, 1960 to 1971 

Thatcher led the Liberals in four general elections: 1960, 1964, 1967, and 1971.  He won two elections with majority governments, but also lost two, in 1960 and 1971.

1960 General election 

In Thatcher's first general election as Liberal leader, Douglas again led the CCF to a majority government.  Thatcher became the Leader of the Opposition.

1 Premier when election was called;  Premier after election. 
2 Leader of the Saskatchewan Liberal Party without seat in the Assembly when election called;  Leader of the Opposition after election.

1964 General election 

The 1964 election was very close in the popular vote, with a difference of only 660 votes between the Liberals and the CCF.  The distribution of votes in the ridings gave the Liberals a majority, ending the CCF's seventeen year term in office.  Thatcher defeated Premier Woodrow Lloyd and became premier.  Lloyd became Leader of the Opposition.

1 Leader of the Opposition before election was called;  Premier after election.
2 Premier when election was called;  Leader of the Opposition after election.

1967 General election 

In the 1967 election, Thatcher led the Liberals to another majority government, the last time the Liberals have formed the government in Saskatchewan.  Thatcher defeated Lloyd for a second time. Lloyd resigned as party leader before the next election, being succeeded by Alan Blakeney.

1 Premier before election was called;  Premier after election. 
2 Leader of the Opposition when election was called;  Leader of the Opposition after election.

1971 General election 

In the 1971 election, Thatcher again led the Liberals, but was defeated by Allan Blakeney, the new leader of the NDP, who won a majority government.  Thatcher died a month after the election.

1 Leader of the Opposition before election was called;  Premier after election.
2 Premier when election was called; died a month after the election.

Saskatchewan constituency elections 

Thatcher stood for election to the Legislative Assembly in four general elections, all in the constituency of Morse.  He was elected in all four elections, from 1960 to 1971.

1960 General election:  Morse 

E Elected
1 Rounding error

1964 General election:  Morse 

E Elected
X Incumbent

1967 General election:  Morse 

E Elected
X Incumbent

1971 General election:  Morse 

E Elected
X Incumbent

Federal constituency elections, 1945 to 1958

Thatcher stood for election to the House of Common five times, in three different Saskatchewan ridings.  He was elected three times and defeated twice. 
He first stood for election as a member of the CCF, and was elected three times (1945, 1949, 1953).  However, part way through his third term as a Member of Parliament, he left the CCF and sat as an independent, from 1955 to 1957.  He then ran as a Liberal in the general elections of 1957 and 1958, but was defeated both times.

1945 General election:  Moose Jaw 

E Elected
X Incumbent

1949 General election:  Moose Jaw 

E Elected
X Incumbent

1953 General election:  Moose Jaw—Lake Centre 

E Elected
1 Elected as a member of the CCF, but left the CFF caucus in 1955 and sat as an independent for the rest of his term as a Member of Parliament.

1957 General election:  Assiniboia 

E Elected
X Incumbent

1958 General election:  Assiniboia 

E Elected
X Incumbent

Saskatchewan Liberal leadership 

Thatcher won the leadership of the Saskatchewan Liberal Party at a party convention held on September 24, 1959.  The runners-up were Wilf Gardiner, Frank Foley, and Alex Cameron.

References

1917 births
1971 deaths
Premiers of Saskatchewan
Queen's University at Kingston alumni
Co-operative Commonwealth Federation MPs
Independent MPs in the Canadian House of Commons
Candidates in the 1957 Canadian federal election
Candidates in the 1958 Canadian federal election
Saskatchewan Liberal Party MLAs
Members of the House of Commons of Canada from Saskatchewan
Members of the King's Privy Council for Canada
Members of the United Church of Canada
People from Moose Jaw
Liberal Party of Canada candidates for the Canadian House of Commons
Leaders of the Saskatchewan Liberal Party